In the Name of the World is the second EP by American rock band The Holy Fire and was produced by The Flaming Lips bassist Michael Ivins.

Track listing
"Raised on Planes" 
"Dreams to Spend"
"Bombs in the Distance" 
"We're Not Here to Learn"
"In the Name of the World"
"Hate Your Smile"

Personnel
Sean Hoen - guitar, vocals
Nathan Miller - bass
Nick Marko - drums
Ryan Wilson - guitar
Michael Ivins - producer
Michael Fossenkemper - engineer
Mark Penxa - artwork

The Holy Fire albums
2006 EPs